Mount Newall is a peak, 1,920 m, the northeast extremity of Asgard Range, in Victoria Land. Discovered by the Discovery expedition (1901–04) and named for one of the men who helped raise funds to send a relief ship for the expedition. Nichols Ridge descends from it down to the Wright Lower Glacier at the east end of Wright Valley. Gallagher Ridge trends northeast toward Wright Valley.

Mountains of the Asgard Range
McMurdo Dry Valleys